Ulan-Gorkhon (Ulaan Gorkhon) is a rural locality (an ulus) in Tunkinsky District, Republic of Buryatia, Russia. The population was 36 as of 2010. There is 1 street.

Geography 
Ulan-Gorkhon is located 29 km east of Kyren (the district's administrative centre) by road. Zhemchug is the nearest rural locality.

References 

Rural localities in Tunkinsky District